The 2002 Talk 'N Text Phone Pals season was the 13th season of the franchise in the Philippine Basketball Association (PBA).

Draft picks

Transactions

Occurrences
Center Asi Taulava and guard Patrick Fran played for Philippine-Selecta team while forward Celedon Camaso played for Philippine-Hapee during the Governor's Cup. Taulava was among the 15 players chosen to play for the national team, Fran and Camaso went back to their mother ballclub starting the Commissioner's Cup.

Talk 'N Text coach Bill Bayno was fined by the PBA for lambasting the league and its commissioner for being a San Miguel Corporation-run league. For two conferences, the former University of Las Vegas coach has caused quite a stir with accusations and comments that cost him over P250,000 in record fines.

Starting the All-Filipino Cup, Talk 'N Text has tapped another American coach Paul Woolpert to replaced Bill Bayno, who abandoned the Phone Pals after a short but controversial stint in the league.

Finals stint
The Talk 'N Text Phone Pals reach the Commissioner's Cup finals opposite defending champion Batang Red Bull by winning over the Alaska Aces, three games to two, in their best-of-five semifinal series. The Phone Pals led in the finals series all throughout until the last two games which Red Bull won to successfully defend their Commissioner's Cup title.

Roster

Elimination round

Games won

References

TNT Tropang Giga seasons
Talk